Nabiseius is a genus of mites in the family Otopheidomenidae. There is at least one described species in Nabiseius, N. arabicus.

References

Mesostigmata
Articles created by Qbugbot